The Paul Street Boys is a 1935 Italian drama film directed by Mario Monicelli and Alberto Mondadori. It is based on the novel by Ferenc Molnár and was entered into the 3rd Venice International Film Festival.

See also
 The Boys of Paul Street, a 1969 Hungarian film based on the same novel

References

External links

1935 films
1930s Italian-language films
1935 drama films
Italian black-and-white films
Films based on Hungarian novels
Films based on works by Ferenc Molnár
Films directed by Mario Monicelli
Italian drama films
1935 directorial debut films
1930s Italian films